The Seafarers is Stanley Kubrick's fourth film and third short documentary, made for the Seafarers International Union, directed in June 1953. The film was Kubrick's first in color.

There are shots of ships, machinery, a canteen, and a union meeting. The film was supervised by the staff of The Seafarers Log, the union magazine. For the cafeteria scene in the film, Kubrick chose a long, sideways-shooting dolly shot to establish the life of the seafarer's community; this shot is an early demonstration of a signature technique that Kubrick would use in his feature films. Another such shot involves a group of seafarers walking across screen from a shaded area to a sunlit space as they approach the SIU Union hall.

The film was re-discovered in 1973 by film scholar and filmmaker Frank P. Tomasulo, who arranged for a 16mm print of the documentary to be deposited in the permanent collection of the Library of Congress' Motion Picture Division.

The Seafarers was released on DVD in 2008 with audio commentary from directors Roger Avary and Keith Gordon, as well as an interview with one of Kubrick's daughters. The short is also available as an extra on the 2012 release of Kubrick's first full-length film Fear and Desire.

References

External links
 
 
 

1953 films
Films directed by Stanley Kubrick
Seafaring films
1950s short documentary films
Sponsored films
Documentary films about the labor movement
American short documentary films
1950s English-language films
1950s American films